Fjell is a former municipality in the old Hordaland county, Norway. It is part of the traditional district of Midhordland. The municipality consisted of several islands west of the city of Bergen, the major ones being Litlesotra, the northern part of Store Sotra, Bildøy, Bjorøy, Misje, and Turøy. The administrative centre of Fjell is the village of Straume. Some of the villages in Fjell included Ågotnes, Fjell, Foldnes, Knappskog, Knarrevik, Kolltveit, Landro, and Sekkingstad. On 1 January 2020, the municipality became part of Øygarden Municipality in Vestland county.

Due to the opening of the Sotra Bridge to the mainland in 1971 and its proximity to the city of Bergen, the population has grown from less than 7,000 to over 25,000 as of 2017. The result is major traffic jams over the bridge every day. The highway that leads to Bergen has reduced the traveling time to only fifteen minutes from the municipal centre at Straume on Litlesotra to the center of Bergen.

At the time of its dissolution in 2020, the  municipality is the 355th largest by area out of the 422 municipalities in Norway. Fjell was the 43rd most populous municipality in Norway with a population of 25,204.

General information

The parish of Fjæld was established as a municipality on 1 January 1838 (see formannskapsdistrikt law). During the 1960s, there were many municipal mergers across Norway due to the work of the Schei Committee. On 1 January 1964, the islands of Misje and Turøyna (population: 404) were transferred from the municipality of Herdla to the municipality of Fjell.

On 1 January 2020, the three neighbouring municipalities of Fjell, Sund, and Øygarden were merged into one large island municipality called Øygarden.

Name
The municipality (originally the parish) is named after the old Fjell farm, where the first Fjell Church was built. The name is identical with the modern Norwegian word fjell which means "mountain". The oldest form of the name was Undir Fjalli which means "under/below the mountain". Before 1918, the name was written Fjæld or Fjeld.

Coat of arms
The coat of arms was granted on 27 April 1957. The arms are black and gray with a blue background. They show the geography in the municipality, specifically the sea (shown with grey wavy lines) and the steep mountains (shown with three black triangular shapes). The grey seagull shown above the mountains is common in the area.

Churches
The Church of Norway had one parish within the municipality of Fjell. It is part of the Vesthordland prosti (deanery) in the Diocese of Bjørgvin.

Geography

Fjell was an island municipality located entirely on islands off the coast of the mainland Bergen Peninsula. It covered many islands in a large archipelago that stretched from Sund in the south to Fedje in the north. The largest island in Fjell was Sotra, although only the northern half of the island is part of Fjell. The second-largest island was Litlesotra, where the largest village area in Fjell is located (the village of Straume). The small island of Bildøyna is located between those two islands. The small island of Geitung lies north of Bildøyna and the small island of Bjorøy lies to the south. Bjorøy is not connected to Fjell by road, but there is the undersea Bjorøy Tunnel that connects it to the city of Bergen. On the western side of Sotra, the smaller islands of Algrøyna, Lokøyna, and Syltøyna are located. On the north end of Sotra lies the small islands of Misje and Turøyna.

History
Fjell was the location of Fjell Fortress, a World War II German mountaintop fortification designed to command all water approaches to the port of Bergen.

Government
All municipalities in Norway, including Fjell, are responsible for primary education (through 10th grade), outpatient health services, senior citizen services, unemployment and other social services, zoning, economic development, and municipal roads. The municipality is governed by a municipal council of elected representatives, which in turn elect a mayor.  The municipality falls under the Bergen District Court and the Gulating Court of Appeal.

Municipal council
The municipal council of Fjell was made up of 35 representatives that are elected to four year terms. The party breakdown of the final municipal council was as follows:

See also
List of former municipalities of Norway

References

External links

 Municipality web site 
Municipal fact sheet from Statistics Norway 

 
Øygarden
Former municipalities of Norway
1838 establishments in Norway
2020 disestablishments in Norway